Geraint  is a Welsh name derived from the Latin name Gerontius. The original Geraint is a figure of Welsh history and legend. Geraint may also refer to:

People
Geraint of Dumnonia (died 710), Celtic king
Geraint Anderson (born 1972), British newspaper columnist and son of Donald Anderson, Baron Anderson of Swansea
Geraint Davies (Plaid Cymru politician) (born 1948), Welsh politician
Geraint Davies (Labour politician) (born 1960), British politician
Geraint Davies (rugby league) (born 1986), Welsh rugby player
Geraint Talfan Davies (born 1943), Welsh journalist
Geraint Wyn Davies (born 1957), Welsh actor and director
Geraint Evans (1922–1992), Welsh singer
Geraint Gruffydd (born 1928), Welsh scholar
Geraint Howells (1925–2004), British politician
Geraint H. Jenkins (born 1946), historian of Wales
Geraint Jones (born 1976), English cricketer
Geraint F. Lewis (born 1969), British astrophysicist
Geraint Lewis (born 1974), former Welsh international rugby union player
Geraint Morgan (1920–1995), British politician
Geraint Morris (1941–1997), Welsh film director
Geraint Thomas (born 1986), Welsh cyclist
Geraint Watkins (born 1951), Welsh musician
Geraint Williams (born 1962), Welsh football player
D. Geraint James (1922–2010), Welsh physician 
J. Geraint Jenkins (1929–2009), Welsh maritime historian and historian of rural crafts

Fictional or invented characters
Geraint the Blue Bard, a supposed medieval Welsh poet invented by Iolo Morganwg
Geraint Cooper, father of Gwen Cooper in the television series Torchwood

See also
RFA Sir Geraint (L3027), British ship

Welsh masculine given names